"Freedom" is a song by Norwegian DJ Kygo featuring English singer, songwriter and musician Zak Abel. It was released through Sony Music on 17 April 2020 as the fourth single from Kygo's third studio album Golden Hour. The song was written by Kyrre Gørvell-Dahll, Lawrie Martin, Sandro Cavazza and Zak Abel.

Music video
A music video to accompany the release of "Freedom" was first released onto YouTube on 17 April 2020. The music video was directed by Johannes Lovund and was originally going to be filmed in the Maldives, but due to the COVID-19 pandemic, Kygo and Abel filmed some clips of them at home while in quarantine.

Personnel
Credits adapted from Tidal.
 Kyrre Gørvell-Dahll – producer, composer, lyricist, associated performer
 Lawrie Martin – producer, composer, lyricist
 Sandro Cavazza – composer, lyricist
 Zak Abel – composer, lyricist, associated performer
 Randy Merrill – mastering engineer
 John Hanes – mixing engineer
 Serban Ghenea – mixing engineer

Charts

Weekly charts

Year-end charts

Release history

References 

2020 songs
2020 singles
Kygo songs
Zak Abel songs
Song recordings produced by Kygo
Songs written by Kygo
Songs written by Sandro Cavazza
Songs written by Zak Abel